lived during the Sengoku Period of the 16th century in Japan. Ichijō was the son of Ichijo Kanesada. Following the destruction of the Ichijo clan, he then went on to marry the daughter of the famous leader of the Chōsokabe clan, Chōsokabe Motochika. However, after defying the will of his father-in-law, he was killed.

1560 births
1580 deaths